Ahmed Imthiyaz (born 24 November 1963) is a swimmer who represented the Maldives at the 1992 Summer Olympics.

Aged 28, Imthiyaz was the oldest of the seven Maldives competitors at the 1992 Summer Olympics, he competed in two swimming events, in the 50 metre freestyle he finished in 71st place out of 75 starters after swimming in a time of 29.27 seconds, he also competed in the 100 metres freestyle, where he finished his heat in a time of 1:04.96 and in 74th place.

References

External links
 

1963 births
Living people
Maldivian male freestyle swimmers
Olympic swimmers of the Maldives
Swimmers at the 1992 Summer Olympics